Cross Heath is a suburb of Newcastle-under-Lyme that is located alongside the A34 road.  It is a ward in the Borough of Newcastle-under-Lyme.  According to the 2001 Census it had a population of 6,159, reducing to 5,887 at the 2011 Census.

References

Villages in Staffordshire
Newcastle-under-Lyme